The Ravenna Bridge is a  high and  long railway viaduct on the Höllental Railway line in the Black Forest, in Breitnau, Breisgau-Hochschwarzwald, Baden-Württemberg, Germany. The origin of the name most likely comes from the French ravin for gorge.

History and construction
The first structure was completed in 1885 and consisted of a steel cantilever span that rested on three mortared sandstone block pillars. The old bridge was then demolished, although the old abutments are still visible.

It was partially cut open and thus has a length today of only .

The bridge was exploded by German forces near the end of the World War II. It was re-built in 1947–48, under the direction of French occupying forces and with the use of German prisoners of war obligated to undertake compulsory labour, so that large quantities of logs from the Black Forest that had to be delivered as war reparations could be transported out.

References

Railway bridges in Germany
Stone bridges in Germany
Viaducts in Germany
Stone arch bridges